Elections to Liverpool City Council were held on 1 November 1904.

The first seat for the new ward of Old Swan, and the second seat for Wavertree West were up for election for the first time.

18 of the 34 seats were uncontested.

After the election, the composition of the council was:

Election result

Ward results

* - Retiring Councillor seeking re-election

Comparisons are made with the 1901 election results, as the retiring councillors were elected in that year.

Abercromby

Aigburth

Anfield

Breckfield

Brunswick

Castle Street

Dingle

Edge Hill

Everton

Exchange

Fairfield

Garston

Granby

Great George

Kensington

Kirkdale

Low Hill

Netherfield

North Scotland

Old Swan

Prince's Park

Sandhills

St. Anne's

St. Domingo

{{Election box candidate with party link|
  |party      = Liverpool Protestant Party
  |candidate  = Henry Porter
  |votes      = 1,518
  |percentage = 53%
  |change     = 
}}

St. Peter's

Sefton Park East

Sefton Park West

South Scotland

Vauxhall

Walton

Warbreck

Wavertree

Wavertree West

West Derby

Aldermanic Elections

At the meeting of the Council on 9 November 1904, the terms of office of seventeen alderman expired.

The following seventeen were elected as Aldermen by the Council (Aldermen and Councillors) on 9 November 1904 for a term of six years.*''' - re-elected aldermen.

 Alderman John Ellison (Conservative, elected 9 November 1901) died on 17 October 1904

In his place, Councillor Thomas Bland Royden (Conservative, Kensington, elected 16 December 1903) was elected as an alderman for the Sefton Park East ward.

By-elections

No.11 Kensington, 23 November 1904

Caused by the election of Councillor Thomas Bland Royden (Conservative, Kensington, elected 16 December 1903) as an alderman on 9 November 1904

No. 7 St. Domingo, 17 January 1905

The resignation of Councillor Joseph Bennett Colton (Conservative, St. Domingo, elected 1 November 1902) was reported to the Council on 4 January 1905

See also

 Liverpool City Council
 Liverpool Town Council elections 1835 - 1879
 Liverpool City Council elections 1880–present
 Mayors and Lord Mayors of Liverpool 1207 to present
 History of local government in England

References

1904
Liverpool
1900s in Liverpool
November 1904 events